Kuk Sool Won is a type of Korean martial arts. It  was founded in 1958 by Suh In-Hyuk (서인혁), who also carries the formal titles of, Kuk Sa Nim (i.e. "national martial arts teacher") and Grandmaster.

This Korean martial art is known for its comprehensive collection of combat techniques, in particular, it teaches an extensive set of offensive and defensive moves designed to take advantage of the human body's many pressure points.

Kuk Sool Won is practiced in various countries, with its biggest bases other than the South Korea and the United States being Western Europe (Germany, France, Italy and Spain) and Iran. However there is a strong following in South America as well.

History

Suh In-Hyuk and foundations of Kuk Sool Won 
As a youth, Suh In-Hyuk was trained by his grandfather, Suh Myung-Deuk, a supposed master-instructor to the Korean Royal Court, as well as following a family tradition of martial arts that stretched back sixteen generations. After the death of his grandfather during the Korean War, Suh In-Hyuk travelled throughout the Far East visiting various Buddhist monasteries and other esteemed martial arts masters, as research for developing his own system. He even had his younger brother, Seo In-Sun, take lessons from the founder of Hapkido, Choi Yong-sool, since there was a significant discount offered to younger students and Seo In-Sun would later show what he was taught to his 2 older brothers, Seo In-Suk & Suh In-Hyuk. A barebones curriculum for the system was developed in 1958 and later, the Kuk Sool Won was founded in 1961 (the initial syllabus continuing to be fleshed out and modified as the years went by). Suh fled South Korea in 1974 due to political troubles and decided to introduce his system to the United States in 1975.

Spread
In 1991, Kuk Sool Won was selected as an extra curricular activity for the U.S. Military Academy at West Point, and in 1992, Grandmaster In Hyuk Suh was presented with the Commander's Sword at West Point.

In the Netherlands, Kuk Sool Won is practiced in six schools. The highest rank instructor in the Netherlands is Robbin Baly (6th dan), who teaches a group of approximately 200 students in Amsterdam and elsewhere.

Kuk Sool Won was imported to Iran in 1980 by Engineer Dariush Ghaffari, who lived in United States prior. He first started teaching the art at the "Tehran Fire Club".

Technique 
Kuk Sool Won relies on a historical perspective of traditional Korean martial arts when outlining its contents, which breaks things down into three main branches:
 Tribal martial arts (사도무술; Sah Doh Mu Sool)
 Buddhist Temple martial arts (불교무술; Bul Kyo Mu Sool)
 Royal Court martial arts (궁중무술; Koong Joong Mu Sool).
Techniques from these three segments were carefully selected and organized into a cohesive curriculum in order to form the basis of Kuk Sool Won. This martial arts knowledge was said to be passed down to Grandmaster Suh In-Hyuk by his grandfather, Suh Myung-deuk, who began teaching him at the tender age of five. But a more simplistic way to describe the contents of Kuk Sool Won would be to acknowledge that it is a successful combination or conglomeration of Hapkido (a derivative of Daitō-ryū Aiki-jūjutsu), Kung Fu (particularly Mantis style, although whether from the Southern or Northern variety isn't clear), and certain indigenous Korean martial arts (such as Taekkyeon). Note that combining disparate martial skills often yields inconsistencies that are difficult to overcome, yet this is not the case for the resulting foundation of elements found in the art of Kuk Sool.

Kuk Sool Won is a systematic study of all of the conventional fighting arts, which together comprise the martial arts history of Korea. As a martial arts system, Kuk Sool Won is extremely well-organized and seeks to integrate and explore the entire spectrum of established Asian fighting arts, along with body conditioning, mental development, and traditional weapons training. The following list represents a short summary regarding the most common elements found in the system: 
 hand strikes and blocking / parrying
 kicks and leg sweeps
 body throws and grappling
 joint-locking techniques
 safe falling (i.e. break-falls) and acrobatics
 various types of body conditioning
 animal style techniques
 traditional Korean weaponry
 martial arts healing methods
 meditation and specialty breathing techniques 

It is a form of self-defense which includes strikes, kicks, grappling, joint locks, as well as traditional weapons training and healing techniques.
The technique is often practiced in class and tournament by utilizing kata-like “Forms” and a 250+ set of “Techniques”. The fighting style is brutal and quick to damage joints beyond repair; practitioners are taught early to only use the arts in controlled settings or in true self defense. There are also types of forms consisting of weapons. Examples include: Short sword, Knife, Sword, Short staff, Middle staff, Cane, Fan, Axe, Bow and Arrow, Jointed staff, (commonly known as Nunchaku) rope, and spear.

In Kuk Sool Won there are four basic sword forms that are taught (each with its own underlying set of principles, or gum bup  검법):
 jung gum hyung - straight [grip] sword form - 정검형
 yuk gum hyung - inverted [grip] sword form - 역검형
 ssang jang gum hyung - twin long sword form - 쌍장검형
 ssang dan gum hyung - twin short sword form - 쌍단검형

{Note: both long & short twin sword forms include techniques where the weapons are held in either the straight or inverted fashion}

Attire 
Kuk Sool Won practitioners don typical martial art uniforms or dobok (도복) for training. Although white being a common colour for the dobok in other styles, supposedly representing "purity," all the uniforms in Kuk Sool Won are black in colour, which according to Korean culture is used to represent wisdom (note: white is also well known to be the colour for mourning).
For special occasions, there is a dress uniform for Black Belt ranks only, which was patterned after the armor worn by ancient Korean generals. In the following section, the table mentions a Wang Sa dobok, which is only worn by the grandmaster of Kuk Sool Won (wang sa translates as "king's teacher" which explains why the royal colours of gold & purple are utilised). Also in the table where colours are mentioned for the General's Uniform, the first colour refers to the trim on the collar & lapel, cuffs, and tails, of the uniform, while the second colour refers to that of the ascot (also mentioned is the type of emblem displayed on the ascot – ascots for all Master ranks sport the KSW–logo).

Ranking system 
For colored belts: A stripe on the center of belts or a taped stripe on the edge of belts can be added for slight accomplishment before the next belt.

See also
 Body & Brain
 Taekkyeon
 Subak
 Hankumdo

References

Further reading 

Korean martial arts
Buddhist martial arts